Tom Salta, also known as Atlas Plug (stylized ATlA5 PlUG), is an American recording artist and soundtrack composer. He has composed soundtracks for many videos games titles, including Tom Clancy's Ghost Recon Advanced Warfighter 1 & 2, Cold Fear, Red Steel and Tom Clancy's H.A.W.X. Salta's score for Red Steel received an award for "Best Original Score" in IGN's Best of 2006 awards. Salta works in multimedia including film, television, advertising, and video games.

Atlas Plug 
Tom Salta is also behind the Atlas Plug moniker, and released his first album, 2 Days or Die, in February 2005.

Notable works

Prince of Persia
The contemporary World Music Score of Prince of Persia: The Forgotten Sands features performance recorded with Percussionist Bashiri Johnson, and vocals by world music singer Azam Ali and international recording artist Judith Bérard. It also features world music and middle-eastern instrumentation such as Doubek, Kora, Khangira, Bowhammer, Cymbalom, Lakota Slide, Walimba, Ney, Duduk, and Custom-Made Instruments.

Red Steel 2

For Red Steel 2, Salta composed a 'Wild West' guitar-driven score blended with Asian music influences. He enlisted the guitar performances of studio musician Steve Ouimette and recorded various instrumentalists for Chinese percussion, Shakuhachi, Fue, Pipa, Harmonica and Violin. Salta's contemporary and traditional Japanese musical score for the original Red Steel won IGN's Wii Award for Best Original Score.

Tom Clancy franchise

The Anthemic Military-themed Orchestral Scores for Tom Clancy's Ghost Recon Advanced Warfighter 1 & 2 Fuse electronic sounds into the score to capture the hi-tech aesthetic of the games for which he was nominated for “Best Video Game Score” at the MTV Video Music Awards. Salta's anthemic orchestral scores for the Tom Clancy franchise captured the attention of the US Marines and subsequently he was assigned to create the music for the Marine Corps' latest recruitment commercial entitled "America's Few." Most recently Salta composed the live-action trailer for Tom Clancy's Ghost Recon: Future Soldier and the score for Ubisoft's WWII real-time strategy game R.U.S.E..

Discography
Recording under the artist name “Atlas Plug”, tracks from his album 2 Days or Die were used by television shows on ABC, CBS, MTV, NBC as well as national commercials. His Atlas Plug music can also be heard in the soundtracks to games such as Crackdown, The Fast and the Furious  and Project Gotham Racing 3. Salta's orchestral music for Hollywood movie trailers and promos includes Toy Story 3, Harry Potter, Spider-Man, Astro Boy, and Coraline. Prior to his composing career, Salta toured with and worked on releases by artists such as Peter Gabriel, Junior Vasquez, Everything But The Girl, Deep Forest, Mary J. Blige and Sinéad O'Connor.

Video games

TV and film

Records and artists

References

Further reading
 Tom Salta interview with IGN (November 2004)

External links
 

Year of birth missing (living people)
Living people
Record producers from Connecticut
Musicians from Norwalk, Connecticut
Video game composers